The men's light welterweight event was part of the boxing programme at the 1984 Summer Olympics. The weight class allowed boxers of up to 63.5 kilograms to compete. The competition was held from 29 July to 11 August 1984. 37 boxers from 37 nations competed.

Medalists

Results
The following boxers took part in the event:

First round
 Dhawee Umponmaha (THA) def. Jaslal Pradhan (IND), 5:0
 Jorge Maysonet (PUR) def. Muenge Kafuanka (ZAI), RSC-1
 Apelu Ioane (SAM) def. Evaristo Mazzon (URU), 5:0
 Charles Nwokolo (NGR) def. Dimus Chisala (ZAM), 5:0
 William Galiwango (UGA) def. Anthony Rose (JAM), 5:0

Second round
 Kim Dong-Kil (KOR) def. Juma Bugino (TNZ), RSC-2
 Javid Aslam (NOR) def. Lisiate Lavulo (TNG), RSC-2
 Jerry Page (USA) def. Helmut Gertel (FRG), 5:0
 Ostavio Robles (MEX) def. Hannu Vuorinen (FIN), 3:2
 Ahmed Hadjala (ALG) def. Umesh Maskey (NEP), RSC-2
 Jean Mbereke (CMR) def. Ramy Zialor (SEY), 5:0
 Mirko Puzović (YUG) def. Denis Lambert (CAN), 5:0
 Steve Larrimore (BAH) def. Philimon Ayesu (MLW), 3:2
 Mircea Fulger (ROU) def. Jean Duarte (FRA), RSC-1
 Stefan Sjøstrand (SWE) def. Hassan Lahmar (MAR), RSC-2
 Lofti Belkhir (TUN) def. Kunihiro Miuro (JPN), 4:1
 Roshdy Armanios (EGY) def. Bhutana Magwaza (SWZ), RSC-2
 David Griffiths (GBR) def. Clifton Charleswell (VIS), 5:0
 Dhawee Umponmaha (THA) def. Charles Owiso (KEN), 3:2
 Jorge Maysonet (PUR) def. Apelu Ioane (SAM), 5:0
 Charles Nwokolo (NGR) def. William Galiwango (UGA), 5:0

Third round
 Kim Dong-Kil (KOR) def. Javid Aslam (NOR), 5:0
 Jerry Page (USA) def. Ostavio Robles (MEX), 5:0
 Jean Mbereke (CMR) def. Ahmed Hadjala (ALG), 4:1
 Mirko Puzović (YUG) def. Steve Larrimore (BAH), 5:0
 Mircea Fulger (ROU) def. Stefan Sjøstrand (SWE), 5:0
 Lofti Belkhir (TUN) def. Roshdy Armanios (EGY), 5:0
 Dhawee Umponmaha (THA) def. David Griffiths (GBR), 4:1
 Jorge Maysonet (PUR) def. Charles Nwokolo (NGR), 3:2

Quarterfinals
 Jerry Page (USA) def. Kim Dong-Kil (KOR), 4:1
 Mirko Puzović (YUG) def. Jean Mbereke (CMR), 5:0
 Mircea Fulger (ROU) def. Lofti Belkhir (TUN), 5:0
 Dhawee Umponmaha (THA) def. Jorge Maysonet (PUR), 5:0

Semifinals
 Jerry Page (USA) def. Mirko Puzović (YUG), 5:0
 Dhawee Umponmaha (THA) def. Mircea Fulger (ROU), 5:0

Final
 Jerry Page (USA) def. Dhawee Umponmaha (THA), 5:0

References

Light Welterweight